Clingman is an unincorporated community in Wilkes County, North Carolina, United States.

References

Unincorporated communities in Wilkes County, North Carolina
Unincorporated communities in North Carolina